is a former Japanese football player.

Playing career
Sakurai was born in Saitama on September 2, 1975. After graduating from high school, he joined his local club Urawa Reds in 1994. He debuted in 1995 and played several matches every season. However could not play many matches. In 1999, he moved to Verdy Kawasaki (later Tokyo Verdy). He became a regular player immediately and played many matches as forward good at dribbling for a long time. In 2005, he moved to newly was promoted to J1 League club, Omiya Ardija based in his local. Although he played many matches until 2006, he could hardly play in the match from 2007 and he retired end of 2008 season.

Club statistics

References

External links

1975 births
Living people
Association football people from Saitama Prefecture
Japanese footballers
J1 League players
Urawa Red Diamonds players
Tokyo Verdy players
Omiya Ardija players
Association football forwards